Tosapusia is a genus of sea snails, marine gastropod mollusks, in the family Costellariidae, the ribbed miters.

Species
Species within the genus Tosapusia include:
 Tosapusia bismarckeana Fedosov, Herrmann & Bouchet, 2017
 † Tosapusia cupressina (Brocchi, 1814)
 Tosapusia duplex (Cernohorsky, 1982)
 Tosapusia evelyniana (Huang, 2017)
 Tosapusia isaoi (Kuroda & Sakurai, 1959)
 † Tosapusia kalimnanensis (Cernohorsky, 1970)
 Tosapusia kurodai (Sakurai & Habe, 1964)
 Tosapusia longirostris Fedosov, Herrmann & Bouchet, 2017
 Tosapusia myurella Fedosov, Herrmann & Bouchet, 2017
 † Tosapusia neudorfensis (Schaffer, 1898) 
 † Tosapusia pseudocupressina (Bałuk, 1997)
 Tosapusia sauternesensis (Guillot de Suduiraut, 1997)
 Tosapusia turriformis Fedosov, Herrmann & Bouchet, 2017
 Tosapusia vitiaz Fedosov, Herrmann & Bouchet, 2017

Synonyms 
 Tosapusia evelynae (Guillot de Suduiraut, 2007): synonym of Tosapusia evelyniana (S.-I. Huang, 2017)

Habitat and Distribution 

As presented in-text in the study of Fedosov et al. (2017):

"Indo-Pacific, from Madagascar to Japan and French Polynesia, in deep water (300–1000 m) on soft bottoms".

References

 Azuma, M. (1965). On the radulae of the family Vexillidae. Venus. 24(1): 53-57. 
 Huang S.-I [Shih-I]. (2015). New Costellariidae (Mollusca: Gastropoda) from Taiwan and the North Atlantic Ocean. Visaya. 4(4): 43-53.

Costellariidae